El Pueblo may refer to:

Places
El Pueblo (Pueblo, Colorado), listed on the NRHP in Pueblo County, Colorado
El Pueblo, Wichita, Kansas
Barrios of Puerto Rico, 75 barrio-pueblos, municipality seats in Puerto Rico

Newspapers
El Pueblo (Spanish newspaper)
El Pueblo (Nicaraguan newspaper)

Other uses
 El Pueblo de Los Ángeles Historical Monument in California
 El Pueblo History Museum in Colorado